The Cleveland Squash Classic 2015 is the women's edition of the 2015 Cleveland Classic, which is a tournament of the PSA World Tour event International (Prize money : 50 000 $). The event took place at the Cleveland Racket Club in Cleveland, Ohio in United States from 29 January to 3 February. Nicol David won her third Cleveland Classic trophy, beating Raneem El Weleily in the final.

Prize money and ranking points
For 2015, the prize purse was $50,000. The prize money and points breakdown is as follows:

Seeds

Draw and results

See also
Cleveland Classic
2015 PSA World Tour

References

External links
WSA Cleveland Classic 2015 website
Cleveland Classic 2015 Squashsite website

Women's Cleveland Classic
Women's Cleveland Classic
2015 in American sports
Cleveland Classic